The following is a list of events affecting American television during 1998. Events listed include television series debuts, finales, cancellations, and channel initiations, closures and rebrandings, as well as information about controversies and disputes.

Events

January

February

March

April

May

June

August

September

October

November

December

Programs

Debuts

Ending this year

Entering syndication this year

Returning this year

Changes of network affiliation

Made-for-TV movies

Miniseries

Television stations

Station launches

Stations changing network affiliation

Births

Deaths

See also

 1998 in the United States
 List of American films of 1998

References

External links
List of 1998 American television series at IMDb

 
1990s in American television